Kuboesphasma is a genus of insects in the family Mantophasmatidae. It is a monotypic genus consisting of the species Kuboesphasma compactum.

Its type locality is Kuboes, Richtersveld, South Africa.

References

Mantophasmatidae
Monotypic insect genera
Insects of South Africa